Henry Bender (born Harry Bandheimer; 1867–1933) was a German stage and film actor. He appeared in more than a hundred films during his career.

Selected filmography
 The Devil (1918)
 Madeleine (1919)
 Whitechapel (1920)
 The Lord of the Beasts (1921)
 Murder Without Cause (1921)
 The Hunt for the Truth (1921)
 The Adventuress of Monte Carlo (1921)
 Peter Voss, Thief of Millions (1921)
 The Riddle of the Sphinx (1921)
 The Two Pigeons (1922)
 Marie Antoinette, the Love of a King (1922)
 Miss Rockefeller Is Filming (1922)
 Sunken Worlds (1922)
 His Excellency from Madagascar (1922)
 The Girl with the Mask (1922)
 Horrido (1924)
 Gobseck (1924)
 The Most Beautiful Woman in the World (1924)
 Express Train of Love (1925)
 Flight Around the World (1925)
 Cock of the Roost (1925)
 Give My Regards to the Blonde Child on the Rhine (1926)
 The Blue Danube (1926)
 Why Get a Divorce? (1926)
 Trude (1926)
 Annemarie and Her Cavalryman (1926)
 Women of Passion (1926)
 The Great Duchess (1926)
 The Pride of the Company (1926)
 The Captain from Koepenick (1926)
 The Circus of Life (1926)
 Wrath of the Seas (1926)
 Vienna - Berlin (1926)
 Darling, Count the Cash (1926)
 When I Came Back (1926)
 The White Horse Inn (1926)
 A Crazy Night (1927)
 The Most Beautiful Legs of Berlin (1927)
 Potsdam (1927)
 The Imaginary Baron (1927)
 The Island of Forbidden Kisses (1927)
 Assassination (1927)
 A Serious Case (1927)
 The Girl from Frisco (1927)
 The Woman from Till 12 (1928)
 Today I Was With Frieda (1928)
 You Walk So Softly (1928)
 Immorality (1928)
 Panic (1928)
 Dear Homeland (1929)
 Dawn (1929)
 Yes, Yes, Women Are My Weakness (1929)
 From a Bachelor's Diary (1929)
 Taxi at Midnight (1929)
 The Singing City (1930)
 The Widow's Ball (1930)
 The Woman Without Nerves (1930)
 Alraune (1930)
 Three Days Confined to Barracks (1930)
 The White Devil (1930)
 Rooms to Let (1930)
 Josef the Chaste (1930)
 The Spanish Fly (1931)
 A Crafty Youth (1931)
 The Office Manager (1931)
 The Emperor's Sweetheart (1931)
Errant Husbands (1931)
 Such a Greyhound (1931)
 The Adventurer of Tunis (1931)
 Holzapfel Knows Everything (1932)
 At Your Orders, Sergeant (1932)
 A Night in Paradise (1932)
 Marion, That's Not Nice (1933)

References

Bibliography
 Chandler, Charlotte. Marlene: Marlene Dietrich, A Personal Biography. Simon and Schuster, 2011.

External links

1867 births
1933 deaths
German male film actors
German male silent film actors
20th-century German male actors
German male stage actors
Male actors from Berlin